Noisettia is a genus of flowering plants in the violet family Violaceae, with a single known species.

Description 
Shrubs, with oblanceolate (wider near tip) leaves. White flowers strongly zygomorphic (bilaterally symmetrical), in axillary fascicles. The corolla, which persists to cover the fruit is orange in colour with a yellow throat and with the bottom petal longer than the others and clawed with a very long spur. The stamens have free filaments, with the lowest two being calcarate (spurred) and possessing a large dorsal connective appendage that is entire and oblong-ovate. In the gynoecium, the style is rostellate (beaked). The fruit is a thick-walled capsule with 3–4 obovoid or papillate seeds per carpel.

Taxonomy 
The genus Noisettia was first described by Kunth in 1821, with two species Noisetia frangulaefolia and N. orinocensis, placing it in the family Violeae, with five other genera. de Candolle included Noisettia in his Violarieae in 1824, with three species and at the same time Martius was describing N. pyrifolia, although this species was later transferred to the related genus, Anchietea. In 1846, Lindley classified it in Violaceae, within the Violales, although Bentham and Hooker (1862) called the family Violarieae.

Historically Noisettia was placed within Violaceae in subfamily Violoideae, tribe Violeae, subtribe Violinae, together with Anchietea, Calyptrion, Schweiggeria and Viola, following Lindley's description of Tribe Violeae. But these divisions have been shown to be artificial and not monophyletic. Molecular phylogenetic studies show that Violaceae is best considered as four clades rather than taxonomic ranks. Noisettia occurs in Clade I of the family, consisting of Viola, Schweiggeria, Noisettia and Allexis, in which  Schweiggeria and Noisettia are monotypic and form a sister group to Viola. Clade 1 represents a subset of the original Violinae, together with the West African Allexis, previously included in tribe Rinoreeae subtribe Rinoreinae.

Etymology 
Kunth named the genus in honour of the horticulturalist Louis Claude Noisette (1772–1849).

Subdivision 
Candolle (1824) recognised three species, considering Kunth's N. frangulaefolia to be a synonym of N. longifolia;

 Noisettia longifolia Kunth
 Noisettia orchidiflora Ging.
 Noisettia acuminata DC.

of which N. longifolia is considered a synonym of N. orchidiflora, and only the latter is accepted by Plants of the World Online, while N. acuminata  is classified as "ambiguous" (unable to reliably identify taxon). Most authors consider Noisettia to be monotypic for N. orchidiflora. N. orchidiflora has a large number of other synonyms.

Species 
Noisettia orchidoflora was first described by Rudge in 1805. Rudge believing it to be a species of Viola, gave it the name of Viola orchidoflora, observing that the enlarged lower petal resembled that of an orchid. With the separation of Noisettia from Viola by Kunth in 1821, Gingins (1823) considered Kunth's original N. frangulaefolia, as N. longifolia.

Distribution and habitat 
Humid coastal forests of Northern and eastern South America, including North, Northeast, South and Southeast Brazil, French Guiana, Peru, and Suriname. (see Map, at Plants of The World Online).

References

Bibliography 

Books
 
 
 
 
 
 
 
 
 
 

Articles
 
 
 
 
 

Websites
 
 
 
 
 

Violaceae
Monotypic Malpighiales genera